Lin Wei-Chu (born 22 January 1979) is a Taiwanese baseball player who competed in the 2004 Summer Olympics.

References

1979 births
Living people
Baseball players from Taichung
Olympic baseball players of Taiwan
Baseball players at the 2004 Summer Olympics
2006 World Baseball Classic players
2009 World Baseball Classic players
Taiwanese expatriate baseball players in Japan
Hanshin Tigers players
Nippon Professional Baseball outfielders
Asian Games medalists in baseball
Baseball players at the 2006 Asian Games
Asian Games gold medalists for Chinese Taipei
Medalists at the 2006 Asian Games
CTBC Brothers managers